Sorin Babii (born 14 November 1963) is a retired pistol shooter from Romania. He competed in the 10 m air pistol and 50 m free pistol events at six consecutive Olympics between 1984 and 2004 and won a gold medal in 1988 and a bronze in 1992.

Babii was included to the national team in 1980 and won one gold, two silver and three bronze medals at European junior championships. In 1985 he moved to the senior category and won two bronze medals at world championships and three gold, six silver and four bronze medals at European championships. He took a break from shooting in 2002–2003 and retired for good in 2008 to become a shooting coach. His trainees include the 2012 Olympic champion Alin Moldoveanu. 

Babii holds the military rank of lieutenant colonel. His wife Lucia Babii is a former Romanian champion in pistol shooting.

Records

References

Romanian male sport shooters
Olympic gold medalists for Romania
Olympic bronze medalists for Romania
Shooters at the 1984 Summer Olympics
Shooters at the 1988 Summer Olympics
Shooters at the 1992 Summer Olympics
Shooters at the 1996 Summer Olympics
Shooters at the 2000 Summer Olympics
Shooters at the 2004 Summer Olympics
Olympic shooters of Romania
1963 births
Living people
Sportspeople from Arad, Romania
Olympic medalists in shooting
Medalists at the 1992 Summer Olympics
Medalists at the 1988 Summer Olympics
20th-century Romanian people